50 Glebe Place is a large terraced house on Glebe Place in the Chelsea district of London SW3. It was built between 1985 and 1987 for the advertiser Frank Lowe. Ed Glinert, in The London Compendium, described it as a folly.

Design
The London: North West edition of the Pevsner Architectural Guides describes the property as featuring a "tall eclectic entrance tower". The building is of three storeys, the topmost being inside the roof space, with a roof garden as well. The tower is of four storeys with windows at each level and a weather vane at the top of a pitched roof. The building is notable for the six statues on its mansard roof, each different, four across the ridge and two others either side of the base of the roof slope, as well as the terracotta figure of a seated girl atop a pillar next to the entrance. The roof is tiled with a multi-coloured pattern of chevrons. There is extensive use of metalwork in front of the windows and for drainage, and a three-part painted inset at the base of the roof.

Gallery

References

External links

Photographs of 50 Glebe Place on Victorian Web

Houses completed in 1987
Houses in the Royal Borough of Kensington and Chelsea
Chelsea, London
Postmodern architecture in the United Kingdom
Folly buildings in England